The BFI London Film Festival is an annual film festival founded in 1957 and held in the United Kingdom, running for two weeks in October with co-operation from the British Film Institute. In 2016, the BFI estimated that roughly 240 feature films and 150 short films from more than 70 countries are screened at the festival each year.

History
At a dinner party in 1953 at the home of film critic Dilys Powell of The Sunday Times attended by film administrator James Quinn, guests discussed the lack of a film festival in London. Quinn went on to start the first London Film Festival, which took place at the new National Film Theatre (now renamed BFI Southbank) from 16–26 October 1957. The first festival screened 15–20 films that were already successful at other festivals, including Akira Kurosawa's Throne of Blood (which opened the festival), Satyajit Ray's Aparajito, Andrzej Wajda's Kanał, Luchino Visconti's White Nights, Ingmar Bergman's The Seventh Seal, Federico Fellini's Nights of Cabiria and Elia Kazan's A Face in the Crowd. The first edition was sponsored by The Sunday Times.

The second festival was held from 6–14 October 1958 and saw the introduction of the Sutherland Trophy, an annual award for "the maker of the most original and imaginative film introduced at the National Film Theatre during the year", which was awarded to Yasujirō Ozu for Tokyo Story. The third festival featured François Truffaut's The 400 Blows, for which he turned up without a ticket and unable to speak English.

The third festival opened 12 October 1959 with the Czech puppet version of A Midsummer Night's Dream directed by Jiří Trnka.

Richard Roud became festival director in 1960, the first year that a British film was shown at the festival; the world premiere of Karel Reisz's Saturday Night and Sunday Morning. The fourth edition also featured Michelangelo Antonioni's L'Avventura and Truffaut's Shoot the Pianist.

The fifth edition opened 17 October 1961 with Jacques Demy's Lola. The 1962 festival featured the first midnight matinee, Tony Richardson's The Loneliness of the Long Distance Runner. Roman Polanski's first feature-length film Knife in the Water and Jean-Luc Godard's Vivre sa vie were also screened.

A new strand of the festival called London Choices was added in 1965. London Choices featured debut and lesser-known features. One of the first London Choices features was Dear John, directed by Lars-Magnus Lindgren.

1967 saw the first features films directed by women screened - Shirley Clarke's Portrait of Jason, Agnès Varda's Les Créatures and Věra Chytilová's Daisies.

Jean-Luc Godard's first English language film, One Plus One, was shown under the London Choices strand in 1968. After the screening, Godard punched producer Iain Quarrier in the face on stage for changes Quarrier made to the film's ending.

1970–1983
Ken Wlaschin became festival director in February 1970 and expanded the size and diversity of the festival. His first festival ran 16 November to 2 December 1970 and featured 28 films, opening with Truffaut's L'Enfant sauvage and featuring Kurosawa's Dodes'ka-den and the world premiere of Anthony Friedman's Bartleby. A recently opened second screen at the NFT was also used. David Lynch's short film The Grandmother was also shown in 1970.

The 1971 festival ran 15 November to 1 December and was expanded to include a directors' section, featuring the premiere of Mike Leigh's feature film debut Bleak Moments. Between 13 and 29 November 1972, 44 films were screened. The 1974 festival opened 18 November and featured 60 films starting with the premiere of Peter Hall's Akenfield. The Texas Chain Saw Massacre was screened in a members-only screening due to it not being classified by the BBFC. Similar screenings were held for The Beast in 1975 and Salò, or the 120 Days of Sodom in 1977.

Newsfront directed by Phillip Noyce opened the 1978 festival on 14 November which ended 16 days later with Jack Gold's The Sailor's Return. The 1979 festival ran 15 November to 2 December, opening with Those Wonderful Movie Cranks directed by Jiří Menzel. The 1980 festival was held between 13–30 November, opening with Kurosawa's Kagemusha and closing with Martin Scorsese's Raging Bull.

The 25th festival opened on 4 November 1981 and featured 127 films and also expanded outside of London with 12 programmes playing around the country. The 1982 festival opened 11 November 1982 with 4 independent British films - Claude Whatham's The Captain's Doll, Peter Greenaway's The Draughtsman's Contract, Barney Platts-Mills' Hero and Mai Zetterling's Scrubbers - and closed 28 November.

Expansion
In 1984, Wlaschin's role as program director for the National Film Theatre (NFT) and festival director was split, with The Guardian film critic Derek Malcolm taking over as festival director, initially temporarily, and Sheila Whitaker as NFT program director. Malcolm expanded the festival to 8 theatres other than the NFT; introduced Festival on the Square, which showed more popular films; added a surprise film each year; and increased attendances, trying to change it from a festival for film buffs to one for the public. The 1984 festival opened with Gremlins at the NFT on 14 November and closed on 2 December with a gala presentation at the Dominion Theatre of a new print of the 1924 version of The Thief of Baghdad starring Douglas Fairbanks with the score composed and conducted by Carl Davis. It was the most popular festival to date with 57,000 tickets sold, and Malcolm was retained to organize the festival the following year.

The 1985 festival was expanded to feature 161 films and ran from 14 November to 1 December, opening with Akira Kurosawa's Ran  and closing with Michael Cimino's Year of the Dragon and Peter Greenaway's A Zed & Two Noughts. The best films of the festival were to be shown around 15 towns around the country after the event.

The films were grouped into regional categories. In 2009 these were: Galas and Special Screenings, Film on the Square, New British Cinema, French Revolutions, Cinema Europa, World Cinema, Experimenta, Treasures from the Archives, Short Cuts and Animation.

Since 1986, the festival has been "topped and tailed" by the opening and closing galas which have become major red carpet events in the London calendar. The opening and closing galas are often world, European, or UK premiere screenings, which take place in large venues in central London. They are attended by the cast and crew of the films and introduced by the festival director, the film's director or producers, and often the actors themselves.

The 30th edition of the festival in 1986 opened with Nicolas Roeg's Castaway and closed with Ken Russell's film Gothic 
(Daily Telegraph, October 10th 1986). The festival had a "post script" the next day on 1 December with a Royal charity performance of Labyrinth attended by Charles, Prince of Wales and Diana, Princess of Wales.

1987–1996
Sheila Whitaker, who had been the manager of the National Film Theatre, replaced Malcolm in 1987. The 1987 festival was the first to open at the Empire, Leicester Square on 11 November 1987. It was due to open with A Prayer for the Dying, a film about an IRA member but was pulled 2 days before the opening following the IRA's Remembrance Day bombing in Enniskillen on 8 November. The film was replaced with Dark Eyes. Most films were screened at either the Odeon West End or at BFI Southbank.

During her period as director, Whitaker continued to expand the festival. By the end of her tenure as director in 1996, the festival had grown to include screenings of over 200 films from around the world, more venues had been added, and more tickets were sold to non-BFI members. She also began the festival's practice of including newly restored films from the National Film Archive and overseas institutions.

The 1990 festival was held between 8-25 November and featured 180 films compared to 145 in the previous year. It opened with Peter Bogdanovich's Texasville and closed with Bernardo Bertolucci's The Sheltering Sky. It also featured the world premiere of Mike Leigh's Life Is Sweet. 

The 1991 festival was held between 6–21 November and was dedicated to David Lean, who had died earlier in the year. The festival opened with the world premiere of Mike Newell's Enchanted April and closed with the European premiere of Mark Peploe's debut film Afraid of the Dark.

The 1994 festival opened on 3 November with the world premiere of Mary Shelley's Frankenstein directed by Kenneth Branagh and closed 20 November with Luc Besson's Léon: The Professional. A 12-film sidebar was added for Arabian and Middle Eastern films, in addition to sidebars for French and Asian films.

Due to classification issues, special permission was needed from Westminster City Council to screen Oliver Stone's Natural Born Killers in 1994 and David Cronenberg's Crash in 1996. The 1996 festival opened with The First Wives Club and also featured Shane Meadows' debut film Small Time.

1997–2011
Adrian Wooton was appointed festival director and Sandra Hebron as festival programmer in 1997. The 2002 festival was held 6–21 November. Hebron became artistic director of the festival in 2003, replacing Wooton. The same year, the festival's name was changed to the BFI London Film Festival.

The 2004 festival ran from 20 October to 4 November, opening with the UK premiere of Mike Leigh's Vera Drake and closed with David O. Russell's I Heart Huckabees.

The 2005 festival was held from 19 October to 3 November and had 180 features, opening with Fernando Meirelles' The Constant Gardener and closing with the UK premiere of George Clooney's Good Night, and Good Luck. 161 of the 180 screenings were sold out.

The fiftieth edition of the festival opened with the European premiere of Kevin McDonald's The Last King of Scotland. It also featured the European premieres of Todd Field's Little Children and Anthony Minghella's Breaking and Entering. It closed with Babel.

The world premiere of Frost/Nixon on 15 October 2008 was the opening night gala of the 2008 festival and Danny Boyle's Slumdog Millionaire was the closing film.

Previously a number of festival awards were presented at the Closing gala, but in 2009, with the aid of some funding from the UK Film Council, a stand-alone awards ceremony was introduced. The UK Film Council helped fund the festival for three years until it was abolished in 2011.

In 2009 the festival, whilst focused around Leicester Square (Vue West End, Odeon West End and Empire) and the BFI Southbank in central London, also screened films across 18 other venues – Curzon Mayfair Cinema, ICA Cinema on The Mall, The Ritzy in Brixton, Cine Lumière in South Kensington, Queen Elizabeth Hall on the South Bank, David Lean Cinema in Croydon, the Genesis Cinema in Whitechapel, The Greenwich Picturehouse, the Phoenix Cinema in East Finchley, Rich Mix in Old Street, the Rio Cinema in Dalston, the Tricycle Cinema in Kilburn, the Waterman Art Centre in Brentford and Trafalgar Square for the open air screening of short films from the BFI National Archive. The 2009 Festival featured 15 world premieres including Wes Anderson’s first animated feature, Fantastic Mr. Fox, Sam Taylor-Wood’s feature début Nowhere Boy, about the formative years of John Lennon, as well as the Festival's first ever Archive Gala, the BFI's new restoration of Anthony Asquith’s Underground, with live music accompaniment by the Prima Vista Social Club.  European premieres in 2009 included Jean-Pierre Jeunet’s Micmacs, Scott Hicks’ The Boys Are Back and Robert Connolly's Balibo, as well as Umesh Vinayak Kulkarni's The Well and Lucy Bailey and Andrew Thompson's Mugabe and the White African.

In 2009, directors travelling to London to introduce their latest work included Michael Haneke (Cannes Palme d'Or winner, The White Ribbon), Atom Egoyan (Chloe), Steven Soderbergh (The Informant!), Lone Scherfig (An Education), Ang Lee (Taking Woodstock), Jane Campion (Bright Star), Gaspar Noé (Enter The Void), Lee Daniels (Precious), Grant Heslov (The Men Who Stare at Goats), and Jason Reitman (Up in the Air). In addition to Fantastic Mr. Fox and Up in the Air, George Clooney supported his role in The Men Who Stare at Goats. The Festival also welcomed back previous alumni such as John Hillcoat (The Road), Joe Swanberg (Alexander The Last) and Harmony Korine (Trash Humpers), whilst also screening films from Manoel de Oliveira (Eccentricities of a Blonde-Haired Girl), Jim Jarmusch (The Limits Of Control), Claire Denis (White Material), Ho-Yuhang (At The End Of Daybreak), Todd Solondz (Life During Wartime), and Joel and Ethan Coen (A Serious Man).

American Express became the festival's principal sponsor in 2010. Previously it had been sponsored by The Times.

The 2011 festival was held from 12–27 October opening with Mereille's 360 and closed with The Deep Blue Sea, both starring Rachel Weisz.

2012–2017
Clare Stewart was appointed as head of exhibition at the BFI in August 2011 replacing Hebron  and was the festival's director from the 2012 edition. Under Stewart, a formal competition was organised in 2012, films were organized into strands such as "Love", "Debate", "Dare" and "Thrill" and films started to be screened outside of London.

The 2012 festival ran from 10–21 October, opening with Tim Burton's Frankenweenie and closing with the European premiere of Mike Newell's Great Expectations.

The 2013 festival was held between 9–20 October opening with Captain Phillips and closing with the world premiere of Saving Mr. Banks, both starring Tom Hanks.

248 films were screened in 2014 and the festival saw a record attendance of 163,000. It ran from 8–19 October, opening with the European premiere of The Imitation Game and closing with the European premiere of Fury. Simultaneous screenings of the opening and closing films took place around the UK.

The Odeon West End, which accounted for 23% of admissions in 2014, closed 1 January 2015, so more screenings moved to the Vue West End as well as moving to the Cineworld Haymarket and Picturehouse Central. Festival attendances fell 4% for the 2015 edition, which ran from 7–18 October. The festival featured 14 world premieres and 40 European premieres, opening with Suffragette and closing with Danny Boyle's Steve Jobs.

The 60th edition of the festival held between 5–16 October 2016 saw the opening of the temporary Embankment Garden Cinema, in Victoria Embankment Gardens. The festival opened with the European premiere of Amma Asante's A United Kingdom and closed with the European premiere of Ben Wheatley's Free Fire.

In the first 60 years of the festival, it had shown 27 films by Rainer Werner Fassbinder, 19 by Satyajit Ray and 18 by Jean-Luc Godard.

The 2017 edition was held between 4–15 October. It opened with Andy Serkis' Breathe and closed with Martin McDonagh's Three Billboards Outside Ebbing, Missouri.

BFI London Film Festival today
While the programme still retains the 'festivals' feel, it also now shows new discoveries from "important and exciting talents" in world cinema. Whilst it continues to be first and foremost a public festival, it is also attended by large numbers of film professionals and journalists from all over the world. Importantly, it offers opportunities for people to see films that may not otherwise get a UK screening along with films which will get a release in the near future. Some films are accompanied by Q&A sessions which give the audience unique access to the filmmaker and/or a member of the cast and offer insight into the making of the film and occasionally an opportunity for the audience to engage directly and ask questions. Other than these events the screenings at the Festival are quite informal and similar to the normal cinema experience. 

Stewart took a sabbatical for the 2018 edition of the festival and her deputy, Tricia Tuttle stood in as interim artistic director. She became artistic director in December 2018. Current film programmers include Kate Taylor (Senior Programmer), Michael Blyth and Laure Bonville.

The 2018 festival was held from 10–21 October. It opened with the European premiere of Steve McQueen's Widows. It saw the first film at the festival to premiere outside London with the UK premiere of Mike Leigh's  Peterloo being held at HOME in Manchester on 17 October as well as the world premiere of Peter Jackson's They Shall Not Grow Old, which was also screened simultaneously around the UK. It closed with the world premiere of Stan & Ollie.

The 2019 edition ran from 2–13 October and opened with Armando Iannucci's The Personal History of David Copperfield which was shown at the Odeon Leicester Square and at the Embankment Garden Cinema. It closed with Martin Scorsese's The Irishman.

The 2020 festival was held between 7–18 October, however, due to the COVID-19 pandemic in the United Kingdom, the festival featured up to 50 online films with only 12 films being shown in London and around the United Kingdom. The festival opened with the European premiere of Steve McQueen's Mangrove and closed with Ammonite, directed by Francis Lee.

The 2021 festival was held from 6 to 17 October 2021, opening with the world premiere of Jeymes Samuel's The Harder They Fall at Royal Festival Hall. It closed with Joel Coen's The Tragedy of Macbeth, his first film without brother Ethan also directing.

The 2022 festival was held from 5 to 16 October 2022, opening with the world premiere of Roald Dahl's Matilda the Musical at the Royal Festival Hall. It closed with Glass Onion: A Knives Out Mystery.

 Programmes 
The Festival is organized in various sections:

 Galas
 Opening Night Gala - Film that screened on the opening night.
 Closing Night Gala - Film that screened on the closing night.
 Headline Galas - About 10 films, includes American Express Gala, Mayor of London's Gala, BFI Patrons' Gala, American Airlines Gala and The May Fair Hotel Gala to name a few.
 Festival and Strand Gala - Red carpet galas of themed strands: Cult, Dare, Thrill, Debate, Love, Laugh, Family, Journey, Create, and Treasures.
 Special Presentations - Focus on new works from major directors. This section includes Documentary, Experimenta, BFI Flare and other Special Presentations.
 Strands - Films were organized according to themes to encourage discovery and to open up the Festival to new audiences. The themes include: 
 Love - films that are sweet, passionate and tough, as well as charts the highs and lows of many kind of love from around the globe.
 Debate - features films that are amplify, scrutinize, argue, surprise and thrives on conversation.
 Laugh - celebrates humour in all its form, from laugh-out-loud comedy to dry and understated
 Dare - features in-your-face, up-front and arresting films that take audience out of their comfort zones
 Thrill - features nerve-shredders that get audience on the edge of their seats
 Cult - features films that are mind-altering and classifiable, as well as sci-fi and horror genre
 Journey - focused on the journey or the destination that transport and shift the perspectives of audience
 Create - features films that channel the electricity of creative process and celebrating artistic expression in all its form
 Experimenta - features films and videos by artists that revolutionize and reshape the vision of cinema
 Family - showcases films for the young and the young at heart
 Treasures - brings recently restored cinematic classics from archives around the world
 Expanded - showcases immersive art and extended reality (XR) content
 In Competition - celebrate the highest creative achievements of British and international filmmakers.
 Official competition - films are competing for the Best Film Award.
 First Feature Competition - films are competing for the Sutherland Award.
 Documentary Competition - films are competing for the Grierson Award.
 Short Film Award - recognizes short from works with a unique cinematic view.

Surprise film
Derek Malcolm introduced a screening of an unannounced film during the festival each year.

Surprise films have included A Chorus Line (1985), The Color of Money (1986), Sideways (2004), Capitalism: A Love Story (2009), Silver Linings Playbook (2012), The Grandmaster (2013), Birdman (2014), Anomalisa (2015), Sully (2016), Lady Bird (2017), Green Book (2018) Uncut Gems (2019), and C’mon C’mon (2021), with the most recent being The Menu (2022).

For the 50th anniversary of the festival, rather than one surprise film, there were 50 screenings of a surprise film around London.

Awards
The categories highlight both emerging and established talent.

The Sutherland Trophy – for the most original and innovative first feature in the London Film Festival. Named after the BFI's patron, The 5th Duke of Sutherland, this award boasts recipients as noteworthy as Ray, Bertolucci, Fassbinder, Godard and Antonioni.
The Grierson Award – for the best feature-length documentary in the festival. This award is given jointly by the LFF and the Grierson Trust which commemorates the pioneering Scottish documentary-maker John Grierson (1898–1972), famous for Drifters and Night Mail. The Grierson Trust has a long-standing tradition of recognising outstanding films that demonstrate integrity, originality and technical excellence and social or cultural significance.

From 2009, a new standalone awards ceremony was launched which included the following awards:

Best Film – celebrates creative, original, imaginative, intelligent and distinctive filmmaking.
Best British Newcomer Award – celebrates new and emerging British film talent and recognises the achievements of a new writer, producer or director who demonstrates real creative flair and imagination with their first feature.
BFI Fellowships – the Festival showcases both the work of new filmmakers and established ones, and presenting two Fellowships provides a fitting contrast to those Awards recognising new talent.

2004
The Sutherland TrophyTarnation, dir. Jonathan Caouette
7th FIPRESCI International Critics AwardAaltra, dir. Gustave de Kervern and Benoît Delépine
The Alfred Dunhill UK Film Talent AwardA Way of Life, dir. Amma Asante
9th Annual Satyajit Ray AwardThe Woodsman, dir. Nicole Kassell
TCM Classic Shorts AwardNits, dir. Harry Wootliff

2005
The Sutherland TrophyFor the Living and the Dead, dir. Kari Paljakka
8th FIPRESCI International Critics AwardMan Push Cart, dir. Ramin Bahrani
The Alfred Dunhill UK Film Talent Award
Producer Gayle Griffiths
The 10th Annual Satyajit Ray AwardPavee Lackeen, dir. Perry Ogden
The Grierson Award for Best DocumentaryWorkingman's Death, dir. Michael Glawogger
TCM Classic Shorts AwardJane Lloyd, dir. HAPPY (Directing duo Guy Shelmerdine and Richard Farmer (director))

2006
The Sutherland TrophyRed Road, dir. Andrea Arnold
9th FIPRESCI International Critics AwardLola, dir. Javier Rebollo
The Alfred Dunhill UK Film Talent Award
Producer Mark Herbert
The 11th Annual Satyajit Ray AwardThe Lives of Others, dir. Florian Henckel von Donnersmarck
The Grierson Award for Best DocumentaryThin, dir. Lauren Greenfield
TCM Classic Shorts AwardSilence Is Golden, dir. Chris Shepherd

2007
The Sutherland TrophyPersepolis, dir. Marjane Satrapi and Vincent Paronnaud
10th FIPRESCI International Critics AwardUnrelated, dir. Joanna Hogg
The Alfred Dunhill UK Film Talent Award
Sarah Gavron, director of Brick LaneThe 12th Annual Satyajit Ray AwardCalifornia Dreamin', awarded posthumously to director Cristian Nemescu
The Grierson Award for Best DocumentaryThe Mosquito Problem and Other Stories, dir. Andrey Paounov
TCM Classic Shorts AwardÀ bout de truffe, dir. Tom Tagholm

2008
The Sutherland TrophyTulpan, dir. Sergey Dvortsevoy
11th FIPRESCI International Critics AwardThree Blind Mice, dir. Matthew Newton
The 13th Annual Satyajit Ray AwardMid-August Lunch, dir. Gianni Gregorio
The Grierson Award for Best DocumentaryVictoire Terminus, dir. Florent de la Tullaye and Renaud Barret
TCM Classic Shorts AwardLeaving, dir. Richard Penfold and Sam Hearn

2009

In 2009, a new annual standalone awards ceremony was launched to showcase the work of imaginative and original filmmakers and to reward distinctive and intriguing work.

The Awards took place at the Inner Temple on 28 October 2009 and were hosted by Paul Gambaccini. Winners of the Sutherland Trophy, Best British Newcomer and Best Film received the inaugural Star of London award designed by sculptor Almuth Tebbenhoff.

Best FilmUn prophète, dir. Jacques Audiard
The Sutherland TrophyAjami, dir. Scandar Copti and Yaron Shani
Best British Newcomer Award
Jack Thorne, writer of The Scouting Book For BoysThe Grierson Award for Best DocumentaryDefamation, dir. Yoav Shamir
BFI Fellowships
Filmmaker – Souleymane Cissé
Actor – John Hurt

Judges

Best Film: Anjelica Huston, John Akomfrah, Jarvis Cocker, Mathieu Kassovitz, Charlotte Rampling, Iain Softley
The Sutherland Trophy: Paul Greengrass, David Parfitt, Matt Bochenski, Gillian Wearing, Molly Dineen, Mark Cosgrove, Kerry Fox, Sara Frain, Michael Hayden, Sandra Hebron
Best British Newcomer Award: Lenny Crooks, Christine Langan, Tessa Ross, Tanya Seghatchian, Michael Hayden, Sandra Hebron
The Grierson Award: Nick Broomfield, Ellen Fleming, Christopher Hird, Michael Hayden, Sandra Hebron

2010
Best FilmHow I Ended This Summer, dir. Alexei Popogrebski
The Sutherland TrophyThe Arbor, dir. Clio Barnard
Best British Newcomer Award
Clio Barnard, director of The ArborThe Grierson Award for Best DocumentaryArmadillo, dir. Janus Metz
BFI Fellowship
Filmmaker – Danny Boyle

2011
Best FilmWe Need to Talk About Kevin, dir. Lynne Ramsay
The Sutherland TrophyLas Acacias, dir. Pablo Giorgelli
Best British Newcomer Award:
Candese Reid, actress in JunkheartsThe Grierson Award for Best DocumentaryInto the Abyss: A Tale of Death, A Tale of Life, dir. Werner Herzog
BFI Fellowships
Filmmaker – David Cronenberg
Actor – Ralph Fiennes

2012

2013

Pawel Pawlikowski, best known for his films My Summer of Love and Last Resort, won the Best Film award for his black and white social drama Ida, his first film shot in his native Poland. Pawlikowski, at the time, was a visiting tutor at the National Film and Television School in Buckinghamshire and one of his pupils there, Anthony Chen, picked up the Best First Feature prize for Ilo Ilo.

2014Leviathan was named the Best Film at the London Film Festival Awards on 18 October 2014, at a ceremony where the main prizes went to Russia, Ukraine (Best First Feature, The Tribe) and Syria (Best Documentary, Silvered Water), three countries at the centre of long-running conflicts. The winning film-makers all said they hoped that culture could help to restore peace to their countries.

2015
At a London Film Festival declared by its director Clare Stewart to be promoting strong women in the industry, both in front of and behind the camera, the theme continued into the awards, with the Best Film being named as the Greek comedy Chevalier, directed by Athina Rachel Tsangari. The winner of the Sutherland Award for Best First Feature, The Witch, was described by the jury as "a fresh, feminist take on a timeless tale." Another woman was honoured with the Grierson Award for the best documentary; the Australian filmmaker Jennifer Peedom, who was shooting Sherpa as a devastating avalanche struck the Himalayas, in April 2014. And the Oscar-winning Cate Blanchett described how she was "deeply honoured and dumbstruck" at being awarded a BFI Fellowship.

2016
Following the previous year's festival aimed to celebrate strong women in the film industry, 2016 was partly designed to better reflect the diverse audiences in society; the festival opened with a film directed by a black director and the BFI Fellowship was awarded to Steve McQueen. Most of the awards, once again, had strong female themes – either being directed by women, about women or both. Kelly Reichardt’s Certain Women won the Official Competition, while Raw, by the French director Julia Ducournau, won the Sutherland Award for the Best First Feature. Noting that there are still too few opportunities for female directors, Ducournau said, "It's about time that things are starting to change. It's good that doors are now being opened." The Grierson Award for the best documentary went to Starless Dreams, filmed inside a rehabilitation centre for juvenile delinquent women in Iran. For the first time, the London Film Festival ran a competition for the best short film. This went to Issa Touma, Thomas Vroege and Floor van de Muelen for the documentary 9 Days – From My Window in Aleppo. Touma, a Syrian photographer who regularly returns to Aleppo, said it was important for intellectuals, academics and artists not to desert the country. "You can't change anything from far away," he said.

2017
Accepting the prestigious BFI Fellowship at the 2017 London Film Festival Awards, director Paul Greengrass acknowledged that it had been a difficult week for the film industry, on the day that Harvey Weinstein was expelled from the Academy that hands out the Oscars. He said the industry had to act and words weren't enough. The Best Film on the night went to Russia's Loveless, making Andrey Zvyagintsev the second director to have won the honour twice. South Africa's John Trengove won the Best First Film award for The Wound. Lucy Cohen's Kingdom of Us, about the aftermath of a suicide, was named the Best Documentary. And Patrick Bresnan's The Rabbit Hunt won the third Best Short Film prize.

2018
Best FilmJoy, dir. Sudabeh Mortezai
(Special mention: Birds of Passage, dir. Cristina Gallego and Ciro Guerra)
The Sutherland AwardGirl, dir. Lukas Dhont
The Grierson Award for Best DocumentaryWhat You Gonna Do When the World's on Fire?, dir. Roberto Minervini
Short Film AwardLasting Marks, dir. Charlie Lyne

2019
Best FilmMonos, dir. Alejandro Landes
(Special commendations: Honey Boy, dir. Alma Har'el; Saint Maud, dir. Rose Glass) 
The Sutherland AwardAtlantics, dir. Mati Diop
(Special commendation: House of Hummingbird, dir. Bora Kim)
The Grierson Award for Best DocumentaryWhite Riot, dir. Rubika Shah
Short Film AwardFault Line (Gosal), dir. Soheil Amirsharifi
(Special commendation: If You Knew, dir. Stroma Cairns)

 2020 
Best FilmAnother Round, dir. Thomas Vinterberg
Best DocumentaryThe Painter and the Thief, dir. Benjamin Ree
Best Short FilmShuttlecock, dir. Tommy Gillard
Best XR/Immersive ArtTo Miss the Ending, created by David Callanan and Anna West
IWC Schaffhausen Filmmaker Bursary Award
Cathy Brady

2021
Best FilmHit the Road, dir. Panah Panahi

Best First Feature FilmPlayground, dir. Laura Wandel

Best DocumentaryBecoming Cousteau, dir. Liz Garbus

Best XR/Immersive ArtOnly Expansion, created by Duncan Speakman

Best Short Film CompetitionLove, Dad, dir. Diana Cam Van Nguyen

Audience AwardCosta Brava, Lebanon, dir. Mounia Akl

2022
Sources:
Best FilmCorsage, dir. Marie Kreutzer

Best First Feature Film (Sutherland Award)1976, dir. Manuela Martelli

Best Documentary (Grierson Award)All That Breathes, dir. Shaunak Sen

Best XR/Immersive ArtAs Mine Exactly, created by Charlie Shackleton

Best Short Film CompetitionI Have No Legs, and I Must Run, dir. Yue Li

Audience Award – FeatureBlue Bag Life, dir. Lisa Selby, Rebecca Hirsch Lloyd-Evans, Alex Fry

Audience Award – ShortDrop Out'' - Ade Femzo

See also
British Film Institute Fellowship

References

External links
BFI London Film Festival Homepage
A brief history of the BFI London Film Festival
Every London Film Festival opening and closing night films

Film festivals in London
Annual events in London
London Film Festival
Film festivals established in 1957
1957 establishments in England